Fridolin Walcher, known professionally as Freedo, is a Swiss songwriter, record producer, and DJ. He often works with German producer Shuko (Christoph Bauss). Freedo is known for producing Zara Larsson's single "Lush Life", The Chainsmokers's single "Takeaway" and remixing Coldplay's "Up & Up".

Freedo discography

References 

Swiss singer-songwriters
Swiss producers
Swiss DJs
Year of birth missing (living people)
Living people